The France Olympic football team represents France in international football competitions in Olympic Games. It has been active since 1900, and first competed in 1900. Olympic football was originally an amateur sport, and as the pre-World War II France national team was also amateur, it was able to send a team to the games. The rules on amateurism were relaxed in the 1980s, which allowed France some success, notably a gold medal finish in 1984. Since 1992 the tournament has been competed by under-23 teams, making France's Olympic qualification dependent on the results of the under-21 team. Only in 2020 the French returned to the Olympic stage.

Results and fixtures

Legend

2021

Players

Current squad
 France's initial final squad was announced on 25 June 2021. However, after several clubs refused to release their players, a new squad was announced on 2 July 2021, along with additional players to complete the final roster. Before the start of the tournament, Niels Nkounkou was called up to replace the injured Jérémy Gelin.
 André-Pierre Gignac, Téji Savanier and Florian Thauvin were the three selected over 23 years old players.
 Caps and goals correct as of 29 July 2021.

Overage players in Olympic Games

Olympic Games record
Since the 1992 Summer Olympics, teams consist of under-23 players, with the possibility of 3 players over the age of 23 being selected. The 1960 Summer Olympics mark the moment FIFA no longer consider Olympic matches to be played by national A teams. Before the 1984 Summer Olympics, only amateur footballers could participate. In fact, some countries fielded teams that were very similar to their A teams since their players were considered amateur.

*Red border indicates tournament was held on home soil.

Coaching history
  FFF Committee: 1900 – Paris & 1908 – London 
  Fred Pentland: 1920 – Brussels 
  Charles Griffiths: 1924 – Paris 
  Peter Farmer: 1928 – Amsterdam
  FFF Committee: 1948 – London & 1952 – Helsinki
  Jean Rigal: 1960 – Rome
  André Grillon: 1968 – Mexico City
  Gaby Robert: 1976 – Montreal
  Henri Michel: 1984 – Los Angeles
  Raymond Domenech: 1996 – Atlanta
  Sylvain Ripoll: 2020 – Tokyo

See also
Sport in France
Football in France
Women's football in France
France national football team
France national football B team
France national under-21 football team
France women's national football team

References

External links
 

European national under-23 association football teams
European Olympic national association football teams
Olympic
Foot